Don Carlos María Isidro Benito de Borbón (29 March 178810 March 1855) was an Infante of Spain and the second surviving son of King Charles IV of Spain and of his wife, Maria Luisa of Parma. As Charles V, he was the first of the Carlist claimants to the throne of Spain. He was a reactionary who stridently opposed liberalism in Spain and the assaults on the Catholic Church. He claimed the throne of Spain after the death of his older brother King Ferdinand VII in 1833. His claim was contested by liberal forces loyal to the dead king's infant daughter. The result was the bloody First Carlist War (1833–1840). Don Carlos had support from the Basque provinces and much of Catalonia, but lost the war and never became king. His heirs continued the traditionalist cause, fought two more Carlist wars and were active into the mid-20th century, but never obtained the throne.

Early life 
Carlos was born on 29 March 1788 at the Palacio Real de Aranjuez in Aranjuez, Community of Madrid. In 1808, Napoleon captured Madrid in the Battle of Somosierra, and he induced Carlos's father Charles IV and Carlos' older brother Ferdinand VII to renounce their rights to the throne of Spain. But Carlos, who was heir presumptive to his brother, refused to renounce his rights to the throne, which he considered to have been given to him by God. From 1808 until 1814, he and his brothers were prisoners of Napoleon at the palace of Valençay in France.

In 1814, Carlos and the rest of the Spanish royal family returned to Madrid. In September 1816, he married his niece Infanta Maria Francisca of Portugal (1800–1834), daughter of King John VI of Portugal and Carlos' sister Carlota Joaquina. Francisca was also sister of the second wife of Carlos' brother, Ferdinand VII. The couple had three sons:

 Infante Carlos de Borbón y Braganza (1818–1861), known as Count of Montemolin
 Infante Juan de Borbón y Braganza (1822–1887), known as Count of Montizón
 Infante Fernando de Borbón y Braganza (1824–1861)

Apart from several formal offices, Carlos took no significant part in the government of Spain. Ferdinand VII had found it necessary to cooperate with the moderate liberals and to sign a Constitution. Carlos, however, was known for his firm belief in the divine right of kings to govern absolutely, the rigid orthodoxy of his religious opinions, and the piety of his life.

During the revolutionary troubles of 1820–1823 (the "liberal triennium"), Carlos was threatened by the extreme radicals, but no attack was made on him. While there were certain conservatives in Spain who wanted to put Carlos on the throne immediately, Carlos himself was a firm believer in the legitimate succession and would never have taken up arms against his brother.

Pragmatic Sanction of 1830
In May 1830, Ferdinand VII published the Pragmatic Sanction, again allowing daughters to succeed to the Spanish throne as well as sons. This decree had originally been approved by the Cortes in 1789, but it had never been officially promulgated. On 10 October 1830, Ferdinand's wife gave birth to a daughter Isabella, who thereupon displaced her uncle in the line of succession.

The clerical party (called in Spanish 'apostólicos') continued to support the rights of Carlos to the throne. They considered the Pragmatic Sanction not only impractical but also illegal. They intrigued in favour of Carlos, but he himself would do no more than assert his rights in words. His wife and her sister, Maria Teresa (1793–1874), the former princess of Beira, on the other hand, were actively engaged in intrigues with the apostólicos.

In March 1833, Ferdinand 'authorised' Carlos to go to Portugal with his wife and sister-in-law. The 'authorisation' was in fact an order to remove Carlos and his adherents from Spain.

In April 1833, Ferdinand called upon Carlos to take an oath of allegiance to Isabella as Princess of Asturias, the title traditionally used by the first in line to the throne. In respectful but firm terms, Carlos refused. He had no personal desire for the throne, but he was adamant that he could not renounce what he considered to be his God-given rights and responsibilities.

Succession

Ferdinand VII died on 29 September 1833. In Madrid, his widow declared herself regent for their daughter. On 1 October, Carlos issued a manifesto declaring his own accession to the throne. He informed the members of Maria Cristina's government that they were confirmed in their posts, and proceeded to the Portuguese-Spanish border. There, he was met by forces loyal to Maria Cristina and Isabella, who threatened to arrest him. Carlos remained in Portugal, which itself was in a state of civil war between the adherents of Carlos' nephew and brother-in-law Miguel and his grand-niece, Miguel's niece Maria II. In Spain, there were various risings which developed into the First Carlist War.

When the Miguelist party was finally beaten in Portugal in 1834, Carlos escaped to the United Kingdom, where the government offered to grant him an annual pension of 30,000 pounds if he would renounce his claims and never return to Spain or Portugal. Carlos refused absolutely. In July, he passed over to France, where he was actively aided by the legitimist party. He soon joined his adherents at Elizondo in the western Pyrenees of Spain. In October 1834, his sister-in-law Cristina issued a decree depriving him of his rights as an Infante of Spain; this was confirmed by the Cortes in 1837.

Carlos remained in Spain for five years. During these years, he accompanied his armies, without displaying any of the qualities of a general or even much personal courage. But he endured a good deal of hardship, and was often compelled to take to hiding in the hills. On these occasions, he was often carried over difficult places on the back of a stout guide commonly known as the "royal jackass" (burro real).

The semblance of a court which Carlos maintained was torn by incessant personal intrigues. While some of his adherents supported him because they believed in his hereditary rights to the throne, others were more concerned to preserve home rule in the Basque districts. There were ongoing conflicts between Carlos' military staff and the clergy who exercised significant influence over him.

In the first few years of the war, there were several moments when victory was within Carlos' grasp. The last of these was the so-called Royal Expedition of the summer of 1837, when Carlos himself accompanied his army from Navarre to the outskirts of Madrid. Carlos hoped to enter the city without any significant bloodshed, but when it became clear that only a battle would win the city, Carlos vacillated. After several days, Carlos himself decided to withdraw; his army melted away and was reduced to a third of its former strength.

His first wife having died in Britain in 1834, Carlos married her elder sister, his own niece Maria Teresa of Portugal, Princess of Beira in Biscay in October 1837.

In June 1838, Carlos appointed Rafael Maroto as his commander-in-chief. In February 1839, Maroto had four Carlist generals shot and issued a proclamation criticizing Carlos' court. When Carlos removed him from office, Maroto marched to Tolosa where Carlos was living and made him a virtual prisoner. Maroto was re-appointed commander-in-chief, and his opponents in Carlos' court were dismissed. Maroto then began private negotiations with Cristina's commander-in-chief, and in August 1839 abandoned Carlos completely.

Final exile

In September 1839, Carlos left Spain for France, where he was briefly imprisoned. For almost another year, some of his commanders continued to fight on his behalf, especially in Catalonia and the Maestrazgo. However, by July 1840, almost all resistance was concluded.

In May 1845, Carlos renounced his rights to the throne of Spain in favour of his eldest son, Carlos Luis. Subsequently, he used the title 'count of Molina'. On 10 March 1855, he died at Trieste (then in the Austrian Empire), where he is buried in the chapel of Saint Charles Borromeo in the cathedral of San Giusto.

In midst of the first Carlist War, on 15 January 1837, the Cortes passed a law, ratified by royal decree of Regent María Cristina, which excluded Don Carlos and several of his named allies from the succession to the Spanish crown and declared them stripped of their Spanish titles. These were: Carlos himself, his descendants, his ally and future wife Teresa of Portugal, Teresa's son Sebastian (1811–1875), and Carlos's nephew Miguel I of Portugal (1802–1866), the other absolutist rival monarch in another country. They were so described as "rebels".

Ancestors

Heraldry

Notes

References
 Carr, Raymond. Spain: 1808–1975 (2nd ed 1982) ch 5
 
 Holt, Edgar. The Carlist Wars in Spain. Chester Springs, Pennsylvania: Dufour Editions, 1967.
 Moral Roncal, Antonio Manuel. Carlos V de Borbón. Madrid: Actas Editorial, 1999

External links

1788 births
1855 deaths
People from Aranjuez
Spanish Roman Catholics
Counts of Spain
Carlist pretenders to the Spanish throne
Spanish infantes
19th-century Roman Catholics
Knights of the Golden Fleece of Spain
Knights Grand Cross of the Order of Isabella the Catholic
Knights of Santiago
Knights of Calatrava
Knights of the Order of Alcántara
Laureate Cross of Saint Ferdinand
Grand Crosses of the Order of Saint Stephen of Hungary
Navarrese titular monarchs
Sons of kings
Non-inheriting heirs presumptive